USS Pontiac (ID 2343) was a commercial ferryboat twice chartered by the U.S. Navy during World War I. After acquiring the ferry from the Pawtucket Steamboat Co, the Navy was not able to find an adequate use for the vessel, such as a minesweeper, and returned it, finally, to its owner.

Built in Rhode Island 

Pontiac, a 112 gross ton steam ferryboat built at East Providence, Rhode Island, in 1883 and rebuilt there in 1909, was previously named Pioneer.

World War I service 

She was chartered by the Navy in March 1918 and briefly was USS Pontiac (ID 2343). However, a planned conversion to a minesweeper was not carried out and she was returned to her owner in June 1918. Again taken over soon after that, she was given back to her owner for a final time in July 1918.

References 
 
 Pontiac (American Ferry, 1883). Briefly served as USS Pontiac (ID # 2343) in 1918

World War I auxiliary ships of the United States
Ferries of Rhode Island
Ships built in Providence, Rhode Island
1883 ships